The 1917 VFL Grand Final was an Australian rules football game contested between the Collingwood Football Club and Fitzroy Football Club, held at the Melbourne Cricket Ground in Melbourne on 22 September 1917. It was the 20th annual Grand Final of the Victorian Football League, staged to determine the premiers for the 1917 VFL season. The match, attended by 28,512 spectators, was won by Collingwood by a margin of 35 points, marking that club's fourth premiership victory.

War had restricted the competition to just six clubs during the home and away season and Fitzroy, despite winning just six of their 15 games, qualified for the final by finishing fourth.

Fitzroy made it into the Grand Final by defeating minor premiers Collingwood by a goal a week earlier but Collingwood this time won comfortably, dominating from the opening quarter.

Alec Mutch of Collingwood was playing his 100th VFL game.

Teams

 Umpire – Norden

Statistics

Goalkickers

Attendance
 MCG crowd – 28,512

References
1917 VFL Grand Final statistics
 The Official statistical history of the AFL 2004 
 Ross, J. (ed), 100 Years of Australian Football 1897–1996: The Complete Story of the AFL, All the Big Stories, All the Great Pictures, All the Champions, Every AFL Season Reported, Viking, (Ringwood), 1996.

See also
 1917 VFL season

VFL/AFL Grand Finals
Grand
Collingwood Football Club
Fitzroy Football Club
September 1917 sports events